San Carlos is the capital of the Venezuelan state of Cojedes.  This city is also the municipal seat of the Ezequiel Zamora Municipality and, according to the 2001 Venezuelan census, the municipality has a population of 83,957.

History 
Father Capuchino Fray Pedro de Berja founded the city of San Carlos de Austria on April 27, 1678.

Demographics 
The San Carlos Municipality, according to the 2001 Venezuelan census, has a population of 83,957 (up from 62,140 in 1990).  This amounts to 33.2% of Cojedes's population.

Government 

San Carlos is the shire town of the San Carlos Municipality in Cojedes.  The mayor of the San Carlos Municipality is Pablo Rodríguez. The last municipal election was held in April 2013.

Sites of interest

Historical sites
 La Blanquera, a historical colonial-baroque style house founded by a wealthy family of Conquistadores in the 18th-century 
 Catedral de San Carlos
 Iglesia Santo Domingo
 Iglesia San Juan Bautista

Squares and parks 
 Plaza Bolívar

References

External links 
 Flag & Coat of Arms of San Carlos

 
Cities in Cojedes (state)
Populated places established in 1678
1678 establishments in the Spanish Empire